Ardameh may refer to:
 Ardameh, Nishapur
 Ardameh, Torqabeh and Shandiz